Nodocapitus barryi is a species of velvet worm in the family Peripatopsidae. This species has 15 pairs of legs in both sexes. It is found in southeastern Queensland and northeastern New South Wales, Australia. The males are distinguished by enlarged papillae on the head, between the antennae.

References

Further reading 
 

Onychophorans of Australasia
Onychophoran species
Animals described in 1996